Hannah Elizabeth Motler is a British fashion model.

Career 

Motler was discovered at age 12, by Premier Model Management while at a One Direction concert in Manchester. Her first show was for Calvin Klein. In her debut season she also walked for Erdem, Dries van Noten, and Versus Versace, (shows which she opened); Miu Miu, Dior, Prada, Moschino, Giambattista Valli, Victoria Beckham, Helmut Lang, Fendi, Marc Jacobs, JW Anderson, Burberry, Coach New York, Givenchy, Chloé, Valentino,  Sonia Rykiel, Maison Margiela, and Louis Vuitton.

Motler has modelled in campaigns for Versace, Miu Miu, and Coach New York, and editorials for magazines including British Vogue, Interview, and Love. Vogue has described her as an "English rose" and "an unstoppable force".

References 

2001 births
Living people
English female models
People from Nottingham
Ford Models models